John Snow (1813–1858) was an English physician and epidemiologist.

John Snow may also refer to:

People
 John Snow (cricketer) (born 1941), English cricketer
 John J. Snow Jr. (born 1945), American politician, former member of the North Carolina Senate
 John James Snow Jr. (born 1929), American politician, former member of the South Carolina House of Representatives
 John W. Snow (born 1939), American politician, 73rd United States Secretary of the Treasury
John Snow (MP) for Yarmouth (Isle of Wight) (UK Parliament constituency)

Other uses
 John Snow, Inc, public health research/consulting firm

See also
 Jon Snow (disambiguation)
 Jack Snow (disambiguation)